Floriano Spiess (born 26 August 1967) is a Brazilian wrestler. He competed in two events at the 1988 Summer Olympics.

References

External links
 

1967 births
Living people
Brazilian male sport wrestlers
Olympic wrestlers of Brazil
Wrestlers at the 1988 Summer Olympics
People from Canoas
Sportspeople from Rio Grande do Sul